Cristhian Montoya Giraldo (born 4 August 1989) is a Colombian cyclist, who currently rides for UCI Continental team .

Major results

2015
 1st  Mountains classification Tour of the Gila
 3rd Overall Clásico RCN
1st Stage 6
 10th Overall Joe Martin Stage Race
2016
 1st Stage 10 Vuelta a Colombia
2017
 1st  Mountains classification Tour of Ankara
 2nd Overall Vuelta Ciclista de Chile
1st Stage 4 
2019
 1st Stage 1 (TTT) Tour of Qinghai Lake
 3rd Overall Vuelta a la Independencia Nacional
1st  Mountains classification
 8th Overall Volta a Portugal
 9th Overall Tour of the Gila
1st  Mountains classification
1st Stage 5
 10th Overall Vuelta del Uruguay
2021
 8th Overall Joe Martin Stage Race
2022
 5th Road race, National Road Championships

References

External links
 
 
 

1989 births
Living people
Colombian male cyclists
Vuelta a Colombia stage winners
Sportspeople from Antioquia Department
21st-century Colombian people